Hugh Smellie (3 March 1840, in Ayr – 19 April 1891, at Bridge of Allan) was a Scottish engineer.

He was locomotive superintendent of the Maryport and Carlisle Railway from 1870–1878, the Glasgow and South Western Railway from 1878–1890 and the Caledonian Railway in 1890.

See also
Locomotives of the Glasgow and South Western Railway
Locomotives of the London, Midland and Scottish Railway

References

1840 births
1891 deaths
19th-century Scottish people
People from Ayr
Scottish engineers
British railway pioneers
Scottish railway mechanical engineers
Caledonian Railway people
Glasgow and South Western Railway people
19th-century British businesspeople